Urszulin may refer to the following places:
Urszulin, Kuyavian-Pomeranian Voivodeship (north-central Poland)
Urszulin, Łódź Voivodeship (central Poland)
Urszulin, Lublin County in Lublin Voivodeship (east Poland)
Urszulin, Ryki County in Lublin Voivodeship (east Poland)
Urszulin, Włodawa County in Lublin Voivodeship (east Poland)
Urszulin, Grodzisk Mazowiecki County in Masovian Voivodeship (east-central Poland)